Kastelli may refer to:

Kastelli Hill, a landform at the city of Chania, Crete, Greece
Kissamos (or Kastelli Kissamou), a settlement in the Chania regional unit, Crete, Greece
Kastelli, Achaea, a subdivision of Kleitoria, Achaea regional unit, Crete, Greece
Kastelli, Heraklion, a municipality in the Heraklion regional unit, Crete, Greece
Kastelli Airport, a mixed-use public/military airport near Kastelli, Heraklion, Crete, Greece
Kastelli Giant's Church, a prehistoric stone enclosure in Finland